Rok Baskera (born 26 May 1993) is a Slovenian footballer who plays as a winger for WSG Radenthein.

Notes

References

External links

Player profile at NZS 

1993 births
Living people
Sportspeople from Celje
Slovenian footballers
Association football wingers
NK Šampion players
NK Olimpija Ljubljana (2005) players
NK Krško players
Slovenian PrvaLiga players
Slovenian expatriate footballers
Slovenian expatriate sportspeople in Italy
Expatriate footballers in Italy
Slovenian expatriate sportspeople in Austria
Expatriate footballers in Austria
Slovenia youth international footballers